Brent Kenneth Ashabranner (November 3, 1921 – December 1, 2016) was an American Peace Corps administrator, including its 1967–69 deputy director, and author of more than 30 books, primarily non-fiction children's literature, which received over 40 awards.

Early life
Ashabranner was born in Shawnee, Oklahoma in 1921, the son of a pharmacist father and sibling of older brother Gerard. After five years, his parents moved the family to El Reno, Oklahoma, where they bought a pharmacy with oil royalties his mother received from family land, and were successful at business. His father lost the drugstore, however, to the Great Depression economy in 1932, followed by closure of their bank. A year later, the family moved to Bristow, Oklahoma, where Ashabranner's father had been offered a better job. Ashabranner was an avid reader and writer in school and became increasingly interested in foreign countries. Sports interests included track and tennis. Ashabranner graduated from high school in 1939.

His brother Gerard studied law informally, though persistently, while working for a local lawyer and passed the state bar exam, enabling him to practice law and support himself. Ashabranner enrolled in Oklahoma A&M (now Oklahoma State University–Stillwater) majoring in English. The school's library introduced him to many of the best writers of the time, including Hemingway and Fitzgerald. While waiting in line to register for classes, Ashabranner met Martha White from Roswell, New Mexico, who would be his future wife. Seeking additional income, Ashabranner's English professor suggested he write pulp fiction; choosing the Western genre, Ashabranner began earning a penny a word – $50 for a 5,000-word story. At the end of his sophomore year, the same professor offered him $100 per month for part-time work in his office. Ashabranner and his wife were married three months later in mid 1941.

With America's entry into World War II five months later, Ashabranner joined the U.S. Navy's Construction Battalion (Seabees), with training at Camp Peary near Williamsburg, Virginia. His education status led to his being assigned to the camp's personnel office and he continued working with camp administrators for two years, during which Ashabranner's wife moved to Williamsburg. Ashabranner was then assigned to the naval amphibious forces.  His vessel visited much of the Pacific before the war ended in August 1945.  The couple resumed their lives in Stillwater in 1946, re-enrolling at Oklahoma A&M and selling his stories. They earned undergraduate degrees in English and Home Economics, respectively, in 1948 and Ashabranner continued on to earn a master's degree in English (1951).  He took a job as an instructor in the school's English department and the couple had two daughters in the early 1950s.

Helping other countries
In 1955, Ashabranner was given a chance to work in Africa. With its well-rated agricultural department, Oklahoma A&M was asked by the Truman administration's Point Four Program to help Ethiopia start an agricultural college. The school was in agreement and had for several years sent people for this purpose.  Ethiopia later asked for help with creating school books, and Oklahoma A&M was again asked to recruit advisors, one of whom was Ashabranner.  The job was for two years, after which he and his family were to return to Stillwater and the English department. Instead, they ended up living in Africa and Asia for 25 years.

Ethiopia
Ashabranner's job, in national capital Addis Ababa, was to start two magazines modeled after My Weekly Reader and Scholastic Corporation's Junior Scholastic. One magazine would be for Ethiopia's elementary grades and written in Amharic, the national language, and the other would be written in English for later grades. The goal was to teach readers about their country and its history. While Ashabranner struggled with Amharic, his work partner, Russel Davis, learned it much more readily.  The two traveled Ethiopia for a month with native counterparts to take in the country's culture. They visited the historic city of Aksum, and various cultural groups including the Amharas, Gallas, Guragies, and Falasha. Ashabranner and Davis used what they learned from this trip, and others like it, to tell educational stories in their magazine articles, and they wrote their first book, The Lion's Whiskers, published in 1959. Ashabranner's wife, Martha, once taught home economics skills at a local girls' school, as well.

Libya and Nigeria
When their time in Ethiopia was up, the Point Four Program asked Ashabranner to help them in Libya. After much consideration, he resigned from the newly renamed Oklahoma State University and his family went to Libya. Davis returned to the U.S. and became an educator at Harvard University, but they continued to write six more books together. While in Libya, one such book was Ten Thousand Desert Swords in 1960. The family next went to Nigeria, long a colony of Britain and about to receive its independence. While Ashabranner worked there, U.S. President John F. Kennedy created the Peace Corps and its first director, Sargent Shriver, visited Nigeria to see about establishing the program. Ashabranner, at that time part of the United States Agency for International Development, was assigned to escort Shriver, who then appointed Ashabranner in charge of setting up operations after Nigeria agreed to participate. Also while there, Ashabranner became a non-fiction writer, working with Davis on their last and best-selling book together, Land in the Sun: The Story of West Africa (1963).

India, America, and Southeast Asia
Ashabranner's next assignment was in India, where he was the local director when its Peace Corps program became the largest in the world in 1965. After nearly four years in India, the next Peace Corps director asked Ashabranner to return to America and become the international program's deputy director. He bought a house in a Maryland suburb of Washington, D.C. and his daughters graduated from Walter Johnson High School there. In May 1969, Ashabranner was among the guests invited to the Nixon White House for Joseph Blatchford's swearing-in ceremony as the third Peace Corps director. Ashabranner's daughter Melissa earned degrees from Temple University and Yale, while daughter Jennifer  trained professionally in pet grooming and photography. Ashabranner and his wife then returned oversees while he worked with the philanthropic Ford Foundation, moving from the Philippines to Indonesia in 1976.

Full-time writing
In 1980, Ashabranner and his wife returned to America to be near their daughters and devote his full-time work to writing non-fiction books for young readers.  Most of his more recent work is illustrated by Paul Conklin, whom Ashabranner first met in Nigeria. Daughter Jennifer also illustrated several of Ashabranner's books, beginning with Always to Remember (1988) about the Vietnam Veterans Memorial. He collaborated with daughter Melissa in Into a Strange Land (1987) and Counting America (1989). In 1988, Ashabranner and his wife moved to Williamsburg, Virginia. While the last book he had published was in 2002, Ashabranner told his doctor he'd be writing as long as he lived.

Death and legacy
Ashabranner died on December 1, 2016, and was survived by his wife and daughters, three grandchildren, and a great-grandchild.

Author Muriel Miller Branch, who wrote in 2000 about the Gullah people, described Ashabranner as a mentor who first discerned her writing talent.

Ashabranner's wife, Martha, died at age 98 on May 30, 2020.

Published works

For children

Other
The Stakes Are High (editor), Bantam (New York), 1954.
A First Course in College English (textbook, with Judson Milburn and Cecil B. Williams), Houghton (Boston), 1962.
A Moment in History: The First Ten Years of the Peace Corps, Doubleday (New York), 1971.

References

1921 births
2016 deaths
20th-century American male writers
20th-century American non-fiction writers
21st-century American male writers
21st-century American non-fiction writers
American children's writers
Carter G. Woodson Book Award winners
Military personnel from Oklahoma
Peace Corps directors
People from Bristow, Oklahoma
People from Shawnee, Oklahoma
People from Stillwater, Oklahoma
People from Williamsburg, Virginia
Seabees
Oklahoma State University alumni
Oklahoma State University faculty
United States Navy personnel of World War II
American expatriates in Ethiopia
American expatriates in Libya
American expatriates in India
American expatriates in Indonesia
American expatriates in the Philippines